This is an alphabetical list of notable IT companies using the marketing term big data:
 Alpine Data Labs, an analytics interface working with Apache Hadoop and big data
 Azure Data Lake is a highly scalable data storage and analytics service. The service is hosted in Azure, Microsoft's public cloud  
 Big Data Partnership, a professional services company based in London
 Big Data Scoring, a cloud-based service that lets consumer lenders improve loan quality and acceptance rates through the use of big data
 BigPanda, a technology company headquartered in Mountain View, California
 Bright Computing,  developer of software for deploying and managing high-performance (HPC) clusters, big data clusters, and OpenStack in data centers and in the cloud
 Clarivate Analytics, a global company that owns and operates a collection of subscription-based services focused largely on analytics
 Cloudera, an American-based software company that provides Apache Hadoop-based software, support and services, and training to business customers
 Compuverde, an IT company with a focus on big data storage
 CVidya, a provider of big data analytics products for communications and digital service providers
 Cybatar Cloud, a cloud-based system for managing, assigning, tracking and monitoring on-demand goods and service delivery tasks and agents.
 Databricks, a company founded by the creators of Apache Spark 
 Dataiku, a French computer software company 
 DataStax
 Domo
 Fluentd
 Greenplum
 Groundhog Technologies
 Hack/reduce
 Hazelcast
 Hortonworks
 HPCC Systems
 Imply Corporation
 MapR
 MarkLogic
 Medio
 Medopad
 NetApp
 Oracle Cloud Platform
 Palantir Technologies
 Pentaho, a data integration and business analytics company with an enterprise-class, open source-based platform for big data deployments
 Pitney Bowes
 Platfora
 Qumulo
 Rocket Fuel Inc.
 SAP SE, offers the SAP Data Hub to connect data bases and other products through acquisition of Altiscale
 SalesforceIQ
 Sense Networks
 Shanghai Data Exchange
 SK Telecom, developer of big data analytics platform Metatron Discovery
 Sojern
 Splunk
 Sumo Logic
 Teradata
 ThetaRay
 TubeMogul
 VoloMetrix
 Zaloni, deployment and vendor agnostic data lake management platform
 Zoomdata

References

Lists of software
Lists of technology companies